India Post Payments Bank, abbreviated as IPPB, is a division of India Post which is under the ownership of the Department of Post, a department under Ministry of Communications of the Government of India. Opened in 2018, as of January 2022, the bank has more than 6 crore customers.

History

On 19 August 2015, the India Post received licence to run a payments bank from the Reserve Bank of India. On 17 August 2016, it was registered as a public limited government company for setting up a payments bank. IPPB is operating with the Department of Posts under Ministry of Communications.

The pilot project of IPPB was inaugurated on 30 January 2017 at Raipur and Ranchi. The first phase of the bank with 650 branches and 3,250 post offices as access points was inaugurated on 1 September 2018. Over ten thousand postmen have been roped into the first phase. By September 2020, the bank had acquired about 3.5 crore customers. The bank had acquired about 4 crore customers by December 2020. In January 2022, India Post Payments Bank has crossed 5 crore customers mark.

Services

IPPB aims to utilize all of India's 155,015 post offices as access points and 3 lakh postal postmen and Grameen Dak Sewaks to provide doorstep banking services.
IPPB offers savings accounts, money transfer and insurances through the third parties, bill and utility payments.

The bank also provides features like:

 QR Card: Customers can use QR code payments eliminating the need to remember account numbers, PINs and passwords.
 Unified Payments Interface
 Immediate Payment Service
 National Electronic Funds Transfer
 Real-time gross settlement
 Bharat BillPay
 Direct Benefit Transfer
 RuPay Debit Card 
AEPS(Adhaar Enabled Payment Service)

IPPB has been allowed to link around 17 crore postal savings bank (PSB) accounts with its accounts.

See also

 Payments bank
 Poste italiane

References

Government-owned banks of India
Payments banks
Indian companies established in 2018
Banks established in 2018
Companies based in New Delhi
Postal savings system
2018 establishments in Delhi